HMS Sutherland was a 50-gun fourth rate ship of the line of the Royal Navy, built at Rotherhithe according to the dimensions laid out in the 1733 proposals of the 1719 Establishment, and launched on 15 October 1741.

Sutherland participated in the Siege of Louisburg, providing shore bombardment for the forces of Brigadier-General James Wolfe.

Sutherland was sold out of the navy in 1770.

Notes

References

Lavery, Brian (2003) The Ship of the Line - Volume 1: The development of the battlefleet 1650-1850. Conway Maritime Press. .

Ships of the line of the Royal Navy
1741 ships